Carlos Mojica (born January 19, 1975) is an American singer-songwriter and musical arranger.

Early life
Carlos Mojica was born in Paterson, New Jersey to Puerto Rican parents. By the age of 15, Mojica and his family had moved to Orlando, Florida and he began singing in numerous local salsa bands.

Career
Mojica began his career in 1990 by collaborating with local bands in Orlando, Florida, and sharing the stage with various artists including Ismael Miranda, Tito Puente Jr., Brenda K. Starr, and Lalo Rodriguez among others.

In 2007, Mojica went solo, forming his band "Sonido Criminal" and touring extensively throughout the U.S. and Latin America. In 2010, Mojica launched his own record label and released his first album Crime Payz, an album that was selected as a Top Ten album by the Latin Beat Magazine in 2011. Mojica later released his second album Competencia Es Ninguna in 2015, which features a prelude track with the voice of Frankie Ruiz .

Personal life
Mojica currently resides in Windermere, Florida, with his wife Delilah Mojica, and their son Tino.

In 1992, Mojica was arrested and sentenced to four years in prison. Mojica stated in a 2016 interview that his experience in jail had helped him turn his life around and he began focusing more on his career as a musician upon his release at age 21.

Discography
 2010: Crime Payz
 2015: Competencia Es Ninguna

References

External links
Official website

1975 births
Living people
People from Paterson, New Jersey
Musicians from Paterson, New Jersey
American musicians of Puerto Rican descent
Spanish-language singers of the United States
American male composers
21st-century American composers
American male singer-songwriters
Latin music songwriters
Salsa musicians
21st-century American singers
21st-century American male singers
Singer-songwriters from New Jersey